The lavender lizardfish (Synodus similis) is a lizardfish of the family Synodontidae, found in the western Pacific including Japan, north eastern Australia, Lord Howe Island, and northern New Zealand, at depths down to 75 m.  Its length is between 12 and 18 cm.

References
 
 Tony Ayling & Geoffrey Cox, Collins Guide to the Sea Fishes of New Zealand,  (William Collins Publishers Ltd, Auckland, New Zealand 1982) 

Synodontidae
Fish described in 1921